South Coast Plaza is a regional shopping mall in Costa Mesa, California. The largest shopping center on the West Coast of the United States, its pre-COVID sales of over $1.5 billion annually were the highest in the United States. The mall is anchored by three Macy's stores, Nordstrom, Bloomingdale's, and Saks Fifth Avenue. The South Coast Plaza is the largest shopping mall in California and the 4th largest in the United States.

History

In March 1967, members of the Segerstrom family, most notably, Harold (Hal) T. Segerstrom, Jr. and cousin, Henry Segerstrom opened a shopping center called "South Coast Plaza" in one of the family's lima bean fields in rapidly growing Orange County. Originally anchored by a May Company that had opened in late 1966 and Sears, the initial phase of the center was designed by Victor Gruen. It was built the same year as The Irvine Company's nearby Fashion Island in Newport Beach.

The success of the center brought rapid expansion: an additional wing with Bullock's in 1973, I. Magnin in 1977, Nordstrom in 1978, and Saks Fifth Avenue in 1979. The opening of the Nordstrom store is considered a seminal event as it was the first Nordstrom store outside of the Pacific Northwest and marked the West Coast and later the nationwide expansion of its chain.

In 1986, the center began opening its largest expansion, with Nordstrom replacing its store with a new location twice the size of the original in May, and the addition of a free-standing wing across Bear Street, identified as "Crystal Court" and anchored by The Broadway and J. W. Robinson's, which opened in the Fall. These two stores were anchors at nearby Fashion Island, but were willing to cannibalize sales at that location due to the strong drawing power of South Coast Plaza. This signified South Coast Plaza's elevation from a regional shopping center to a national shopping destination. The expansion continued in fall 1987 with an enlargement of Bullock's and the redevelopment of the former Nordstrom as additional center space, including a Tiffany's that opened in fall 1988. The Crystal Court standalone wing never performed as well as the original center, its separation due both to land restrictions and the fact that May Co. and The Broadway routinely refused to allow each other to build stores at their existing centers, which explains the proximity of so many competing malls throughout Southern California.

In 1991, the I. Magnin location was closed by I. Magnin's new owner, Federated Department Stores and reopened as the first standalone Bullock's Men's store, also owned by Federated. May Co. and Robinson's merged in 1993 to form Robinsons-May, retaining both locations as separate full-line stores, while the two Bullock's locations and Broadway store were all renamed Macy's in early 1996, with again like Robinsons-May, separate stores being maintained on either side of Bear Street. In 1995, prior to the Federated Department Stores/Broadway Stores merger, Bloomingdale's was in negotiations to build a location at South Coast Plaza, but other anchor tenants would not give permission for its construction. When Federated merged all the stores into its Macy's West division in 1996, it opted to not convert Broadway's Crystal Court location to Bloomingdale's.

Another $100,000,000 renovation and reconfiguring of the center came in 2000, with Robinsons-May closing its Crystal Court location and expanding the original May Co. store. The separate Crystal Court name was dropped and the free-standing wing, now called the west wing, was joined to the original center by a -long pedestrian bridge across Bear Street. The west side was reoriented toward home furnishings, anchored by the former Broadway store, which was refurbished as Macy's Home and Furniture. The former J. W. Robinson's store was redeveloped as center space at the time, housing primarily Crate & Barrel, Borders Books and Music, and Sport Chalet.

In March 2006, the Robinsons-May store, historically the first store at South Coast Plaza as the May Company, was closed as part of its merger with Macy's and re-opened as Bloomingdale's in May 2007.

South Coast Plaza is still privately held by the Segerstrom family (and the second largest family-owned center in the United States behind the Mall of America), and so is one of the few shopping centers in the United States that have not been purchased by a Real estate investment trust/REIT.

Sandra (Sandy) Segerstrom Daniels a Managing Partner of C. J. Segerstrom & Sons, founded the Festival of Children Foundation in 2002.   The foundation hosts the annual Festival of Children at South Coast Plaza each September.

Festival of Children coincides with the foundation's efforts to recognize September as National Child Awareness Month.

Architecture

South Coast Plaza has always had a strong design element in its building. One of the most striking additions to the mall was the angular 1973 Bullock's wing designed by Welton Becket and the 1977 I. Magnin wing designed by Frank Gehry. In 1982, Henry Segerstrom commissioned the sculptor, Isamu Noguchi, to design a small plaza at one end of the South-Coast facility. The result, "California Scenario" was an international prizewinner and is enjoyed by visitors and workers from the surrounding office buildings alike. The 1986–1987 expansion introduced postmodern architecture to the mall with a recurring pyramid motif. Chandeliers took the shape of inverted pyramids, and the escalator atrium leading to the center's third floor is loosely modeled after the Grand Gallery of the Pyramid of Khufu. The original Mid-Century modern exteriors of Sears and May Company were redesigned shortly thereafter. In 2000, the pedestrian bridge, known as Bridge of Gardens, and accompanying Garden Terrace were completed by landscape architect Kathryn Gustafson. There are also carousels placed in wide rest areas.

In 2006, Anton Segerstrom decided that the center was well overdue for a remodeling and brought in Bentley Management Group as the project manager and Gruen Associates as the architect.  Howard S. Wright was selected as the general contractor and construction began in summer 2006 on a $30 million remodeling project to update the center. South Coast Plaza underwent an intense makeover, with Italian ivory marble replacing the original burgundy tile floors, and travertine to surround new water and fountain features. Modern and contemporary oil-rubbed bronze replaced the dated brass side railings and all door/elevator hardware including a glass elevator. Construction began in the Bloomingdale's wing, and was completed in time for the 40th anniversary of South Coast Plaza, in the Fall of 2007, just one year later. This is the largest remodel for the center since the construction of the Bridge of Gardens connecting the main building with the Crystal Court in 1999, and the exterior/interior remodel of the West building.

Today

South Coast Plaza continuously brings in approximately 24 million visitors annually. Its stores generate revenue of nearly 1.5 billion dollars per year, making it the highest-grossing center in the United States.

In 2004, South Coast Plaza received the Federal Trademark as "The Ultimate Shopping Resort".

A number of luxury brands have chosen South Coast Plaza as one of their few (and for some brands, their only) store locations. Zara made its debut in the California market opening their first California store in South Coast Plaza in 2004. In 2005, French luxury design house Chloé opted to open their second United States boutique at South Coast Plaza. In 2009, Chloe opened its second Southern California boutique on Melrose Place in Los Angeles, and to this day still with Rodeo Drive in Beverly Hills notably absent. Watch Manufacturer Rolex opened their flagship U.S. location at South Coast Plaza. Purveyor of modern furniture Room & Board also opened a  showroom in 2002.

Since 2007, South Coast Plaza has held "Fashion Plates", an annual 10-day Restaurant Week-like promotion of its high-end restaurants at discounted rates.

In 2016, Italian designer brand, WEEKEND MaxMara, opened its freestanding store in California.

In July 2017, the Sears store was sold to the mall owners.

On October 15, 2018, it was announced that Sears would be closing as part of a plan to close 142 stores nationwide. The Sears anchor was closed permanently on January 1, 2019, making it the last original anchor store to close in the mall.

In 2019, Furla opened a new store at South Coast Plaza. This is the first store in the company to open in California.

In August 2020, South Coast Plaza reopened after an extended closure due to COVID-19 with additional safety measures, including social distancing requirements and more frequent cleaning of this. 

In 2021, new stores that opened in this year include Thom Browne, Ganni, Untuckit, Louis Vuitton California Dream, Psycho Bunny, Loewe, Sock harbor, and even Nectar Bath Treats.

Location

The center is adjacent to Interstate 405 in an area called South Coast Metro, which includes portions of the cities of Costa Mesa and Santa Ana.

See also
List of the world's largest shopping malls
List of largest shopping malls in the United States

References

External links

"California Scenario", sculptured plaza by Isamu Noguchi, poem

Shopping malls in Orange County, California
Buildings and structures in Costa Mesa, California
Shopping malls established in 1967
1967 establishments in California
Victor Gruen buildings
Tourist attractions in Costa Mesa, California